Tibet came under the control of People's Republic of China (PRC) after the Government of Tibet signed the Seventeen Point Agreement which the 14th Dalai Lama ratified on 24 October 1951, but later repudiated on the grounds that he rendered his approval for the agreement while under duress. This occurred after attempts by the Tibetan Government to gain international recognition, efforts to modernize its military, negotiations between the Government of Tibet and the PRC, and a military conflict in the Chamdo area of western Kham in October 1950. The series of events came to be called the "Peaceful Liberation of Tibet" by the Chinese government, and the "Chinese invasion of Tibet" by the Central Tibetan Administration and the Tibetan diaspora.

The Government of Tibet and the Tibetan social structure remained in place in the Tibetan polity under the authority of China until the 1959 Tibetan uprising, when the Dalai Lama fled into exile and after which the Government of Tibet and Tibetan social structures were dissolved.

Background 
Tibet came under the control of the Qing dynasty of China in 1720 after the Qing expelled the forces of the Dzungar Khanate from Tibet. It remained under Qing suzerainty (or protectorate) until 1912. The succeeding Republic of China claimed inheritance of all territories held by the Qing dynasty, including Tibet. This claim was provided for in the Imperial Edict of the Abdication of the Qing Emperor signed by the Empress Dowager Longyu on behalf of the six-year-old Xuantong Emperor: "...the continued territorial integrity of the lands of the five races, Manchu, Han, Mongol, Hui, and Tibetan into one great Republic of China" (...). The Provisional Constitution of the Republic of China adopted in 1912 specifically established frontier regions of the new republic, including Tibet, as integral parts of the state.

After the Xinhai Revolution in 1911, most of the area comprising the present-day Tibet Autonomous Region (TAR) became a de facto independent polity, independent from the rest of the Republic of China with the rest of the present day TAR coming under Tibetan government control by 1917. Some border areas with high ethnic Tibetan populations (Amdo and Eastern Kham) remained under the Chinese Nationalist Party (Kuomintang) or local warlord control.

The TAR region is also known as "Political Tibet", while all areas with a high ethnic Tibetan population are collectively known as "Ethnic Tibet". Political Tibet refers to the polity ruled continuously by Tibetan governments since earliest times until 1951, whereas ethnic Tibet refers to regions north and east where Tibetans historically predominated but where, down to modern times, Tibetan jurisdiction was irregular and limited to just certain areas.

At the time, Political Tibet obtained de facto independence, its socio-economic and political systems resembled Medieval Europe. Attempts by the 13th Dalai Lama between 1913 and 1933 to enlarge and modernize the Tibetan military had eventually failed, largely due to opposition from powerful aristocrats and monks.
On 12 August 1927, the Republic of China mandated that before the publication of new laws, all laws in history regarding Tibetan Buddhism should continue unless there were conflicts with new doctrine or new laws of the Central Government. The Tibetan government had little contact with other governments of the world during its period of de facto independence, with some exceptions; notably India, the United Kingdom, and the United States. This left Tibet diplomatically isolated and cut off to the point where it could not make its positions on issues well known to the international community.

Tibet's attempts to remain independent 
In July 1949, in order to prevent Chinese Communist Party-sponsored agitation in political Tibet, the Tibetan government expelled the (Nationalist) Chinese delegation in Lhasa. The (Nationalist) Chinese approved  request to exempt Lhamo Dhondup from lot-drawing process using Golden Urn to become the 14th Dalai Lama on 31 January 1940.   In November 1949, Tibetan government sent a letter to the U.S. State Department and a copy to Mao Zedong, and a separate letter to the British government, declaring its intent to defend itself "by all possible means" against PRC troop incursions into Tibet.

In the preceding three decades, the conservative Tibetan government had consciously de-emphasized its military and refrained from modernizing. Hasty attempts at modernization and enlarging the military began in 1949, but proved mostly unsuccessful on both counts. By then, it was too late to raise and train an effective army. India provided some small arms aid and military training. However, the People's Liberation Army was much larger, better trained, better led, better equipped, and more experienced than the Tibetan Army.

In 1950, the 14th Dalai Lama was 15 years old and had not attained his majority, so Regent Taktra was the acting head of the Tibetan Government. The period of the Dalai Lama's minority is traditionally one of instability and division, and the division and instability were made more intense by the recent Reting conspiracy and a 1947 regency dispute.

Preparations by the People's Republic of China 

Both the PRC and their predecessors the Kuomintang (ROC) had always maintained that Tibet was a part of China. The PRC also proclaimed an ideological motivation to "liberate" the Tibetans from a theocratic feudal system. In September 1949, shortly before the proclamation of the People's Republic of China, the Chinese Communist Party (CCP) made it a top priority to incorporate Tibet, Taiwan Island, Hainan Island, and the Penghu Islands into the PRC, peacefully or by force. China viewed incorporating Tibet as important to consolidate its frontiers and address national defense concerns in the southwest. Because Tibet was unlikely to voluntarily give up its de facto independence, Mao in December 1949 ordered that preparations be made to march into Tibet at Qamdo (Chamdo), in order to induce the Tibetan Government to negotiate. The PRC had over a million men under arms and had extensive combat experience from the recently concluded Chinese Civil War.

Negotiations between Tibet and the PRC 
Talks between Tibet and China were mediated with the governments of Britain and India. On 7 March 1950, a Tibetan delegation arrived in Kalimpong, India, to open a dialogue with the newly declared People's Republic of China and to secure assurances that the Chinese would respect Tibetan "territorial integrity", among other things.  The onset of talks was delayed by debate between the Tibetan, Indian, British, and Chinese delegations about the location of the talks.  Tibet favored Singapore or Hong Kong (not Beijing; at the time romanized as Peking); Britain favored India (not Hong Kong or Singapore); and India and the Chinese favored Beijing.  The Tibetan delegation did eventually meet with the PRC's ambassador General Yuan Zhongxian in Delhi on 16 September 1950.  Yuan communicated a 3-point proposal that Tibet be regarded as part of China, that China be responsible for Tibet's defense, and that China be responsible for Tibet's trade and foreign relations. Acceptance would lead to peaceful Chinese sovereignty, or otherwise war. The Tibetans undertook to maintain the relationship between China and Tibet as one of priest-patron:

They and their head delegate Tsepon W. D. Shakabpa, on 19 September, recommended cooperation, with some stipulations about implementation. Chinese troops need not be stationed in Tibet. It was argued that Tibet was under no threat, and if attacked by India or Nepal, could appeal to China for military assistance. While Lhasa deliberated, on 7 October 1950, Chinese troops advanced into eastern Tibet, crossing the border at five places. The purpose was not to invade Tibet per se but to capture the Tibetan army in Chamdo, demoralize the Lhasa government, and thus exert powerful pressure to send negotiators to Beijing to sign terms for a handover of Tibet. On 21 October, Lhasa instructed its delegation to leave immediately for Beijing for consultations with the Communist government, and to accept the first provision, if the status of the Dalai Lama could be guaranteed, while rejecting the other two conditions. It later rescinded even acceptance of the first demand, after a divination before the Six-Armed Mahākāla deities indicated that the three points could not be accepted, since Tibet would fall under foreign domination.

Invasion of Chamdo 

After months of failed negotiations, attempts by Tibet to secure foreign support and assistance, PRC and Tibetan troop buildups, the People's Liberation Army (PLA) crossed the Jinsha River on 6 or 7 October 1950.  Two PLA units quickly surrounded the outnumbered Tibetan forces and captured the border town of Chamdo by 19 October, by which time 114 PLA soldiers and 180 Tibetan soldiers had been killed or wounded.  Writing in 1962, Zhang Guohua claimed "over 5,700 enemy men were destroyed" and "more than 3,000" peacefully surrendered. Active hostilities were limited to a border area northeast of the Gyamo Ngul Chu River and east of the 96th meridian.  After capturing Chamdo, the PLA broke off hostilities, sent a captured commander, Ngabo, to Lhasa to reiterate terms of negotiation, and waited for Tibetan representatives to respond through delegates to Beijing.

Further negotiations and incorporation 

The PLA sent released prisoners (among them the governor-general of Kham, Ngapoi Ngawang Jigme), to Lhasa to negotiate with the Dalai Lama on the PLA's behalf. Chinese broadcasts promised that if Tibet was "peacefully liberated", the Tibetan elites could keep their positions and power.

One month after China invaded Tibet, El Salvador sponsored a complaint by the Tibetan government at the UN, but India and the United Kingdom prevented it from being debated.

Tibetan negotiators were sent to Beijing and presented with an already-finished document commonly referred to as the Seventeen Point Agreement. There was no negotiation offered by the Chinese delegation; although the PRC stated it would allow Tibet to reform at its own pace and in its own way, keep internal affairs self-governing and allow religious freedom; it would also have to agree to be part of China. The Tibetan negotiators were not allowed to communicate with their government on this key point, and pressured into signing the agreement on 23 May 1951, despite never having been given permission to sign anything in the name of the government. This was the first time in Tibetan history its government had acceptedalbeit unwillinglyChina's position on the two nations' shared history.

Tibetan representatives in Beijing and the PRC Government signed the Seventeen Point Agreement on 23 May 1951, authorizing the PLA presence and Central People's Government rule in Political Tibet. The terms of the agreement had not been cleared with the Tibetan Government before signing and the Tibetan Government was divided about whether it was better to accept the document as written or to flee into exile. The Dalai Lama, who by this time had ascended to the throne, chose not to flee into exile, and formally accepted the 17 Point Agreement in October 1951. According to Tibetan sources, on 24 October, on behalf of the Dalai Lama, general Zhang Jingwu sent a telegram to Mao Zedong with confirmation of the support of the Agreement, and there is evidence that Ngapoi Ngawang Jigme simply came to Zhang and said that the Tibetan Government agreed to send a telegram on 24 October, instead of the formal Dalai Lama's approval. Shortly afterwards, the PLA entered Lhasa. The subsequent incorporation of Tibet is officially known in the People's Republic of China as the "Peaceful Liberation of Tibet" ( Hépíng jiěfàng xīzàng dìfāng), as promoted by the state media.

Aftermath 

For several years, the Tibetan Government remained in place in the areas of Tibet where it had ruled prior to the outbreak of hostilities, except for the area surrounding Qamdo that was occupied by the PLA in 1950, which was placed under the authority of the Qamdo Liberation Committee and outside the Tibetan Government's control. During this time, areas under the Tibetan Government maintained a large degree of autonomy from the Central Government and were generally allowed to maintain their traditional social structure.

In 1956, Tibetan militias in the ethnically Tibetan region of eastern Kham just outside the Tibet Autonomous Region, spurred by PRC government experiments in land reform, started fighting against the government. The militias united to form Chushi Gangdruk Volunteer Force. When the fighting spread to Lhasa in March 1959, the Dalai Lama left Lhasa on March 17 with an entourage of twenty, including six Cabinet ministers, and fled Tibet.

Both the Dalai Lama and the PRC government in Tibet subsequently repudiated the 17 Point Agreement, and the PRC government in Tibet dissolved the Tibetan Local Government. The legacy of this action continues to the present day.

See also 

 1959 Tibetan uprising
 History of Tibet
 Tibet under Yuan rule
 Tibet under Qing rule
 Tibet (1912–1951)
 History of Tibet (1950–present)
 Incorporation of Xinjiang into the People's Republic of China
 List of military occupations
 Monument to the Peaceful Liberation of Tibet
 Sino-Tibetan War (1930–1932)
 Tibetan sovereignty debate

References

Citations

Sources 
 
 Ford, Robert. Wind Between The Worlds The extraordinary first-person account of a Westerner's life in Tibet as an official of the Dalai Lama (1957) David Mckay Co., Inc.
 
 
 
 Knaus, Robert Kenneth. Orphans of the Cold War: America and the Tibetan Struggle for Survival (1999) PublicAffairs . 
 Laird, Thomas. The Story of Tibet: Conversations with the Dalai Lama (2006) Grove Press. 
 
 
 Robert W. Ford Captured in Tibet, Oxford University Press, 1990,

Further reading 

 The Tibet issue: Tibetan view, BBC,
 The Tibet issue: China's view, BBC

 
Annexation
History of Tibet
1950 in Tibet
1950 in China
1950 in politics